The numerous epithets of Jupiter indicate the importance and variety of the god's cult in ancient Roman religion.

Capitoline cult
Jupiter's most ancient attested forms of cult are those of the state. The most important of his sanctuaries in Rome were located on the Capitoline Hill (Mons Capitolinus), earlier Tarpeius. The Mount had two peaks, each devoted to acts of cult related to Jupiter. The northern and higher peak was the citadel (arx). On the arx was located the observation place of the augurs (the auguraculum), to which the monthly procession of the sacra Idulia was directed. On the southern peak was the most ancient sanctuary of the god, traditionally said to have been built by Romulus: this was the Temple of Jupiter Feretrius, which was restored by Augustus. The god here had no image and was represented by the sacred flintstone (silex). The most ancient known rites, those of the spolia opima and of the fetials, connect Jupiter with Mars and Quirinus, and are dedicated to Iuppiter Feretrius or Iuppiter Lapis. From this earliest period, the concept of the sky god encompassed the ethical and political domain.

Lightning and rain
Juppiter Tonans ("Thundering Jove") was the aspect (numen) of Jupiter venerated in the Temple of Juppiter Tonans, which was vowed in 26 BCE  by Augustus and dedicated in 22 on the Capitoline Hill; the Emperor had narrowly escaped being struck by lightning during the campaign in Cantabria. An old temple in the Campus Martius had long been dedicated to Juppiter Fulgens. The original cult image installed in the sanctuary by its founder was by Leochares, a Greek sculptor of the 4th century BCE. The sculpture at the Prado is considered to be a late 1st-century replacement commissioned by Domitian. The Baroque-era restoration of the arms gives Jupiter a baton-like scepter in his raised hand.

Among Jupiter's most ancient epithets is Lucetius, interpreted as referring to light (lux, lucis), specifically sunlight, by ancient and some modern scholars such as Wissowa. The Carmen Saliare, however, indicates that it refers to lightning. To the same atmospheric complex belongs the epithet Elicius: while the ancient erudites thought it was connected to lightning, it is in fact related to the opening of the reservoirs of rain, as is testified by the ceremony of the Nudipedalia, meant to propitiate rainfall and devoted to Jupiter. and the ritual of the lapis manalis, the stone which was brought into the city through the Porta Capena and carried around in times of drought, which was named Aquaelicium.

Other early epithets connected with the atmospheric quality of Jupiter are Pluvius, Imbricius, Tempestas, Tonitrualis, tempestatium divinarum potens, Serenator, Serenus and, referred to lightning, Fulgur, Fulgur Fulmen, later as nomen agentis  Fulgurator, Fulminator: the high antiquity of the cult is testified by the neutre form Fulgur and the use of the term for the bidental, the lightningwell dug on the spot hit by a lightningbolt.

Agriculture and war
A group of epithets has been interpreted by Wissowa (and his followers) as a reflection of the agricultural or warring nature of the god, some of which are also in the list of eleven preserved by Augustine. The agricultural ones include Opitulus, Almus, Ruminus, Frugifer,  Farreus,  Pecunia, Dapalis, Epulo. Augustine gives an explanation of the ones he lists which should reflect Varro's: Opitulus because he brings opem (means, relief) to the needy, Almus because he nourishes everything, Ruminus because he nourishes  the living beings by breastfeeding them, Pecunia because everything belongs to him.

Dumézil maintains the cult usage of these epithets is not documented and that the epithet Ruminus, as Wissowa and Latte remarked, may not have the meaning given by Augustine but it should be understood as part of a series including  Rumina,  Ruminalis ficus, Iuppiter Ruminus, which bears the name of Rome itself with an Etruscan vocalism  preserved in inscriptions, series that would be preserved in the sacred language (cf. Rumach Etruscan for Roman). However many scholars have argued that the name of  Rome, Ruma, meant in fact woman's breast. Diva Rumina, as Augustine testifies in the cited passage, was the goddess of suckling babies: she was venerated near the ficus ruminalis and was offered only libations of milk. Here moreover Augustine cites the verses devoted to Jupiter by Quintus Valerius Soranus,  while hypothesising Iuno (more adept in his view as a breastfeeder), i. e. Rumina instead of Ruminus, might be nothing else than  Iuppiter: Iuppiter omnipotens regum rerumque deumque Progenitor genetrixque deum....

In Dumézil's opinion Farreus should be understood as related to the rite of the confarreatio the most sacred form of marriage, the name of which is due to the spelt cake eaten by the spouses, rather than surmising an agricultural quality of the god: the epithet means the god was the guarantor of the effects of the ceremony, to which the presence of his flamen is necessary and that he can interrupt with a clap of thunder.

The epithet Dapalis is on the other hand connected to a rite described by Cato and mentioned by Festus. Before the sowing of autumn or spring the peasant offered a banquet of roast beef and a cup of wine to Jupiter; it is natural that on such occasions he would entreat the god who has power over the weather, however  Cato's  prayer is one of sheer offer and no request. The language suggests another attitude: Jupiter is invited to a banquet which is supposedly abundant and magnificent. The god is honoured as summus. The peasant may hope he shall receive a benefit, but he does not say it. This interpretation  finds support in the analogous urban ceremony of  the epulum Iovis, from which the god derives the epithet of  Epulo  and which was a magnificent feast accompanied by flutes.

Epithets related to warring are in Wissowa' s view  Iuppiter Feretrius, Iuppiter Stator, Iuppiter Victor and Iuppiter Invictus. Feretrius would be connected with war by the rite of the first type of  spolia opima which is in fact a dedication to the god of the arms of the defeated king of the enemy that happens whenever he has been killed by the king of Rome or his equivalent authority. Here too Dumézil notes the dedication has to do with being regal and not with war, since the rite is in fact the offer of the arms of a king by a king: a proof of such an assumption is provided by the fact that the arms of an enemy king captured by an officer or a common soldier were dedicated to Mars and Quirinus respectively.

Iuppiter Stator was first attributed by tradition to Romulus, who pledged to build a temple in his honor in exchange for his almighty help at a critical moment in the final battle of the war with King Titus Tatius of the Sabines. Dumézil opines the action of Jupiter is not that of a god of war who wins through fighting: Jupiter acts by causing an inexplicable change in the morale of the fighters of the two sides. The same feature can be detected also in the certainly historical record of the battle of the third Samnite War in 294 BC, in which consul Marcus Atilius Regulus vowed a temple to Iuppiter Stator if "Jupiter will stop the rout of the Roman army and if afterwards the Samnite legions shall be victoriously massacred...It looked as if the gods themselves had taken side with Romans, so much easily did the Roman arms succeed in prevailing...". in a similar manner one can explain the epithet Victor, whose cult was founded in 295 BC on the battlefield of Sentinum by Quintus Fabius Maximus Gurges and who received another vow again in 293 by consul Lucius Papirius Cursor before a battle against the Samnite legio linteata. Here too the religious meaning of the vow is in both cases  an appeal to the supreme god by the Roman chief at a time when as a chief  he needs divine help from the supreme god, even though for different reasons: Fabius had remained the only political and military responsible of the Roman State after the devotio of P. Decius Mus, Papirius had to face an enemy who had acted with impious rites and vows, i. e. was religiously reprehensible.

More recently Dario Sabbatucci has given a different interpretation of the meaning of Stator within the frame of his structuralist and dialectic vision of Roman calendar, identifying oppositions, tensions and equilibria: January is the month of Janus, at the beginning of the year, in the uncertain time of winter (the most ancient calendar had only ten months, from March to December). In this month Janus deifies kingship and defies Jupiter. Moreover January sees also the presence of Veiovis who appears as an anti-Jupiter, of Carmenta who is the goddess of birth and like Janus has two opposed faces, Prorsa and Postvorta (also named Antevorta and Porrima), of Iuturna, who as a gushing spring evokes the process of coming into being from non-being as the god of passage and change does. In this period the preeminence of Janus needs compensating on the Ides through the action of Jupiter Stator, who plays the role of anti-Janus, i. e. of moderator of the action of Janus.

List of epithets
Unless otherwise noted, the alphabetical list of epithets listed below are those compiled by Carl Thulin for the 1890 Paulys Real Encyclopädie. The abbreviation O.M. stands for Optimus Maximus, one of the most common epithets for Jupiter.

 Adventus O. M.  (arrival, birth)
 Aetetus O. M.
 Almus
 Amaranus
 Anxurus ("of Anxur, now Terracina")
  ("of the Apennines")
 Arcanus (protector of the arca, arcane: at Praeneste)
 Balmarcodes O. M.
 Beellefarus
 Bronton  (thundering)
 Cacunus
 Caelestis O. M. (Heavenly)
 Caelus O. M.
 Capitolinus O. M. ("of the  Capitol")
 Casius ("of Mount Casius", the modern Jebel Aqra; a form of Baʿal Zephon)
 Ciminius (of Mount Ciminus, now Mount Cimino)
 Clitumnus (of river Clitumnus)
 Cohortalis O. M.
 Conservator ("preserver")
 Culminalis O. M.
 Cultor ("cultivator")
 Custos ("protector, warden")
 Damascenus O. M. ("of Damascus)
 Dapalis  (from daps: dinner, banquet)
 Defensor O. M.
 Depulsor O. M.
 Depulsorius O. M.
 Dianus

 Dolichenus ("of  Dolichus"; it is the ancient Teshub of the Hittites)
 Domesticus
 Diovis
 Elicius (who sends forth, elicits)
 Epulo (who gives or takes part in banquets)
 Exsuperantissimus O. M.
 Fagutalis (of the Fagutal: the god had a temple near an old oak there)
 Farreus (from the confarreatio, according to Wissowa and Dumézil.)
 Feretrius  (who is carried around or whom spoils are carried to on a frame or  litter)
 Fidius (fusion with  Dius Fidius)
 Flagius (worshipped at Cuma)
 Frugifer (who bears fruits)
 Fulgur
 Fulgurator
 Fulmen
 Fulminator
 Grabovius (in the Iguvine Tables: who is carried around on a ceremonial litter, from Etruscan crapis ceremonial litter)
 Hammon O. M. (worshipped in the oasis of Siwa)
 Heliopolitanus ("of Heliopolis Syriaca", modern Baalbek; a form of Baʿal)
 Hercius
 Hospes (hospitable or friendly). Mentioned by Ovid in Metamorphoses, Book 10, line 224. Guardian of hospitality, equivalent to Zeus Xeinios
 Imbricitor (who soaks in rainwater)
 Impulsor
 Indiges (later the divine identification of Aeneas)
 Inventor
 Invictus
 Iurarius (of oaths)
 Iutor (benefictor, beneficent)
 Iuventas
 Lapis (flintstone: the f. sends sparkles similar to lightning)
 Latiaris
 Liber (who is free, or who frees, also the semen)
 Liberator
 Libertas
 Lucetius (shining, for his lightningbolts)
 Maius (majestic, great) at Tusculum
 Maleciabrudes
 Monitor O. M.  (leader, warner)
 Nundinarius (patron of the nundinae)
 Obsequens (agreeable, complacent)
 Opitulator or Opitulus (reliever)
 Optimus Maximus (O. M.)
 Paganicus
 Pantheus
 Patronus
 Pecunia
 Pistor  (baker)
 Pluvialis (of the rains)
 Poeninus
 Praedator
 Praestes (present, protector) at Tibur
 Praestabilis
 Praestitus
 Propagator O. M.
 Propugnator
 Puer (child)
 Purgator (purifier)
 Purpurio O. M.
 Quirinus (fusion with Quirinus)
 Rector (who rules)
 Redux
 Restitutor
 Ruminus (who breastfeeds)
 Salutaris O. M.
 Savazios (fusion with Sabatius)
 Sempiternus
 Serapis (fusion with Serapis)
 Serenator (who clears the sky)
 Serenus ("clear, serene, calm; happy")
 Servator O. M. ("saviour, preserver, observer")
 Sospes ("saviour")
 Stator
 Striganus
 Succellus (fusion with Celtic god Succellus)
 Summanus
 Tempestas
 Terminus
 Territor  (who scares)
 Tifatinus (of Mount Tifata near Capua)
 Tigillus (beam of the universe)
 Tonans (thundering)
 Tonitrator (who generates thunder)
 Tutator (warden)
 Valens (strong, sound, effective)
 Versor (who overthrows or who pours rain)
 Vesuvius (worshipped at Capua)
 Viminus (of the Viminal Hill place in which the god had a temple)
 Vindex (protector, defensor)
 Vircilinus

Epithets from Augustine
St. Augustine names eleven epithets of Jupiter in his work De civitate Dei:

 Victor: he who conquers all things.
 Invictus: he who is conquered by none.
 Opitulus: he who brings help to the needy.
 Impulsor: he who has the power of impelling.
 Stator: he who has the power of  establishing, instituting, founding.
 Centumpeda: he who has the power of  rendering stable, lasting.
 Supinalis: he who has the power of throwing on the back.
 Tigillus: he who holds together, supports the world.
 Almus: he who nourishes all things.
 Ruminus: he who nourishes all animals.
 Pecunia: he to whom everything belongs.

Jupiter outside Rome

Iuppiter Latiaris
The cult of Iuppiter Latiaris was the most ancient known cult of the god: it was practiced since  very remote times on the top of the Mons Albanus on which the god was venerated as the high protector of the Latin League, which was under the hegemony of Alba Longa.

After the destruction of Alba  by king Tullus Hostilius the cult was forsaken.  The god manifested his discontent through  the prodigy of a rain of stones: the commission sent by the senate to inquire into it was also greeted by a rain of stones and heard  a loud  voice from the grove on the summit of the mount  requiring the Albans to perform the religious service to the god according to the rites of their country. In consequence of this event the Romans instituted a festival of nine days (nundinae).   However a plague ensued:  in the end Tullus Hostilius himself  was affected and lastly killed by the god with a lightning bolt. The festival was reestablished on its primitive site by the last Roman king Tarquin the Proud under the leadership of Rome.

The feriae Latinae, or Latiar as they were known originally, were the common festival (panegyris) of the so-called Priscan Latins and of the Albans. Their restoration aimed at grounding Roman hegemony in this ancestral religious tradition of the Latins. The original cult was reinstated unchanged as is testified by some archaic features of the ritual: the exclusion of wine from the sacrifice the offers of milk and cheese and the ritual use of rocking among the games. Rocking is one of the most ancient rites mimicking ascent to heaven and is very widespread. At the Latiar the rocking took place on a tree and the winner was of course the one who had swung the highest. This rite was said to have been instituted by the Albans to commemorate the disappearance of king Latinus, in battle against Mezentius the king of Caere: the rite symbolized a search for him both on earth and in heaven. The rocking as well as the customary drinking of milk was also considered to commemorate and ritually reinstate infancy. The Romans in the last form of the rite brought the sacrificial ox from Rome and every participant was bestowed a portion of the meat, rite known as carnem petere. Other games were held in every participant borough. In Rome a race of chariots (quadrigae) was held starting  from the Capitol: the winner drank a liquor made with absinthe. This competition has been compared to the Vedic rite of the vajapeya: in it seventeen chariots run a symbolic race which must be won by the king in order to allow him to drink a cup of madhu, i. e. soma. The feasting lasted for at least four days, possibly six according to Niebuhr, one day for each of the six Latin and Alban decuriae. According to different records 47 or 53 boroughs took part in the festival  (the listed names too differ  in Pliny  NH III 69 and Dionysius of Halicarnassus AR V 61). The Latiar became an important feature of Roman political life as they were feriae conceptivae, i. e. their date varied each year: the consuls and the highest magistrates were required to attend shortly after the beginning of the administration. They could not start  campaigning before its end and if any part of the games had been neglected or performed improperly the Latiar had to be wholly repeated. The inscriptions from the imperial age record the festival back to the time of the decemvirs.
Wissowa remarks the inner linkage of the temple of the Mons Albanus with that of the Capitol apparent in the common association with the rite of the triumph:  since 231 BC some triumphing commanders had triumphed  there first with the same legal features as in Rome.

Iuppiter Arcanus
Arcanus was the epithet of one of  the Jupiters worshipped at Praeneste. His theology and cult are strictly connected to that of the Fortuna Primigenia worshipped in the famous sanctuary there. He is the protector of the lots sortes  stored in the arca, whence his epithet. G. Dumézil  attempted a purely Indoeuropean interpretation of the theology of Fortuna and of her relationship with Juppiter and Juno, other scholars see the subcessive accretion  of a Greek-Etruscan and then a later Greek influence on Fortuna and the theological structure underlying her relationship to Jupiter, i. .e. earlier the child and then the parent of Fortuna. Jacqueline Champeaux interprets the boy represented on the cista of the 3rd century BC from Praeneste, now at the Archaeological Museum of Villa Giulia in  Rome, as Jupiter puer and arcanus: the image engraved on it represents a boy sitting in a cave, reading a lot inscribed on a tablet. This might be a mythic illustration of the working of the oracle, in which Jupiter is at one time the child (puer) who ritually draws the rods of the lots (here while deciphering one) and their keeper, arcanus.

The sortes of Praeneste were inscribed on rods of chestnut wood: they had sprung out of earth fully inscribed when a certain Numerius Suffustius cut the earth open with his spade, under the indication of some dreams.

A different interpretation of the epithet is directly connected to the word arx, which designates the political, military and religious centre of ancient Italic towns. Thus Iuppiter Arcanus is the god  of the arx of Praeneste. This interpretation is supported by numerous inscriptions found on the area around the local arx,  sited on the summit of Monte Ginestro (m. 752), which dominates the town. The wall in opus  polygonale climbed from the town to surround the arx: epigraphs attest the cults of Iuppiter Arcanus and Mars.

Iuppiter Appenninus
The god was venerated in a sanctuary at the mountain pass between Umbria and Marche now named Scheggia Pass, about eight miles North-East of Iguvium along the Via Flaminia, on Mount Petrara. He had a famous oracle there which gave his responsa by means of sortes (lots). Its reputation was great during the Empire and it was consulted by emperor Aurelian. Dedications have been excavated on the place  and in Algeria on the top of a hill near Philippeville. Claudian mentions the oracle in his description of the travel of Honorius from Fanum Fortunae.

As was the case for the sanctuary of Iuppiter Poeninus on the Great St. Bernard, the mountain pass held a religious significance as a point of communication between different geographic areas, a passage to a different and unknown world that required a religious protection for the traveller.

Other Italic Jupiters
Jupiter was worshipped also under the epithets of Imperator Maximus in Praeneste, Maius in Tusculum, Praestes  in Tibur,  Indiges at Lavinium and Anxurus at Anxur (now Terracina), where he was  represented as a young  man without beard.

In Umbro-Oscan areas he was Iuve Grabovius in the Iguvine Tables, Iuppiter Cacunus (of the top of mountains, cf. Latin cacumen and Iuppiter Culminalis), Iuppiter Liber (see section on Liber above), Diuve Regature in the Table of Agnone that Vetter interprets as Rigator, he who irrigates, and Dumézil as Rector, he who rules and Diuve Verehasus tentatively rendered by Vetter as Vergarius.

Bibliography

 Georg Wissowa religion und Kultus der Römer Munich 1912
 Georges Dumézil La religione romana arcaica. Edizione e traduzione  a cura di Furio Jesi  Milano 1977 (expanded translation into Italian based on the 2nd edition of La religion romaine archaïque Paris 1977.
 Jacqueline Champeaux Fortuna. Recherches sur le culte de la Fortune à Rome et dans le monde romain dés  origines à la mort de César. I: Fortune dans la religion archaïque Paris 1982; "Sors Oraculi. Les oracles en Italie sous la République et  l'Empire" in MEFRA 102 1990 1.

References

 
Ancient Roman religion
Roman gods
Jupiter